This is a list of mosques in Palestine.

West Bank

Nablus area
Great Mosque of Nablus - Nablus
Al-Hanbali Mosque - Nablus
Al-Khadra Mosque - Nablus
Al-Masakin Mosque - Nablus
Nabi Yahya Mosque - Sebastia
An-Nasr Mosque - Nablus
Al-Nurayn Mosque – Qusra
Al-Tina Mosque - Nablus

Ramallah area
Ein Misbah Mosque - Ramallah
Jamal Abdel Nasser Mosque - Ramallah
Mosque of Lower Ramallah - Ramallah

Bethlehem area
Al-Hamadiyya Mosque - al-Khader
Mosque of Omar - Bethlehem

Hebron area
Amir Sanjar al-Jawli Mosque - Hebron
Ibrahimi Mosque - Hebron
Ishaqiyyah Mosque - Hebron
al-Qazzazeen Mosque - Hebron
Sheikh Ali al-Bakka Mosque - Hebron

Jenin area
Fatima Khatun Mosque - Jenin
Shiekh Zayid Mosque - Jenin

Gaza Strip

Gaza
Aybaki Mosque
Abu Khadra Mosque
Great Mosque of Gaza - Old City of Gaza
Ibn Marwan Mosque - Tuffah
Ibn Uthman Mosque - Shuja'iyya
Mahkamah Mosque - Shuja'iyya
Sayed al-Hashim Mosque - Old City of Gaza
Al-Shamah Mosque - Old City of Gaza 
Sheikh Zakariyya Mosque
Katib al-Wilaya Mosque - Old City of Gaza

Beit Hanoun
Umm al-Nasr Mosque - Beit Hanoun

Deir al-Balah
Al-Khader Mosque - Deir al-Balah

Jabalia
Omari Mosque - Jabalia

East Jerusalem
East Jerusalem's status is disputed by Israel and Palestine, currently unilaterally under sovereign control of Israel.

Al-Aqsa Mosque - Old City of Jerusalem
Al-Khanqah al-Salahiyya Mosque - Old City
Marwani Mosque - Old City
Mosque of Omar - Old City
Abdeen Mosque - Wadi al-Joz
Sultan Ibrahim Ibn Adham Mosque - Beit Hanina

References

Gallery

External links

Directory of Mosques in Jerusalem Archnet Digital Library.
Directory of Mosques in the Palestinian territories Archnet Digital Library.

Palestine
 
Mosque